Andrew Gajda (February 26, 1907 – June 4, 1956) was an American soccer player who was a member of the U.S. soccer team at the 1936 Summer Olympics.  At the time, he played for the Boston Soccer Football Club.

References

External links

 Andrew Gajda's profile at Sports Reference.com

1907 births
1956 deaths
American soccer players
Olympic soccer players of the United States
Footballers at the 1936 Summer Olympics
Association football forwards